WGEM-TV (channel 10) is a television station licensed to Quincy, Illinois, United States, serving the Quincy, Illinois–Hannibal, Missouri–Keokuk, Iowa market as an affiliate of NBC, The CW Plus, and Fox. Owned by Gray Television, it is a sister operation to sports radio station WGEM-FM (105.1). The two stations share studios in the New Tremont Apartments (formerly the Hotel Quincy) on Hampshire Street in downtown Quincy. WGEM-TV's transmitter is located east of the city on Cannonball Road near I-172.

Until August 2, 2021, WGEM-TV served as the flagship television property of founding owner Quincy Media, and was sister to the company's namesake newspaper, The Quincy Herald-Whig.

History
WGEM-TV's license was originally granted to Quincy Broadcasting Company, a subsidiary of the Herald-Whig; it was allotted channel 10. The station was originally affiliated with NBC and ABC, while being represented by Walker Representation Co. Quincy Broadcasting's president at the time was T. C. Oakley; Joe Bonansinga was the station's founding general manager. The station received their DuMont transmitters on the same truck as nearby KHQA-TV (channel 7) on July 27, 1953. The crews competed to see who could get on the air first. WGEM began interim broadcasting two hours per night on September 4, 1953.

During the 1960s, WGEM shared its secondary ABC affiliation with CBS affiliate KHQA-TV. This arrangement ended in 1969, when WJJY-TV in Jacksonville, Illinois, went on the air as the ABC affiliate for Quincy; when WJJY went bankrupt and shut down in 1971, WGEM resumed carrying a few ABC shows until the mid-1990s. The station also had a secondary affiliation with Fox between 1990 and 1994, after which the station moved its Fox affiliation to a separate cable-only channel.

Until 2021, WGEM-TV was the only locally owned and operated station in the market. It was also one of the few and longest operating television stations in the country, outside of network owned-and-operated stations, that had the same call letters, owner, channel number, and primary network affiliation throughout its history.

Since the mid-to-late 1990s, WGEM has branded almost exclusively with its call letters.

On February 1, 2021, Gray Television announced that it had entered into an agreement to acquire most of Quincy Media's television properties for $925 million in a cash transaction. The acquisition was completed on August 2, resulting in the first ownership change for WGEM-TV since its 1953 sign-on. WGEM-TV gained several sister stations in many nearby midwestern television markets, including fellow NBC affiliate KWQC-TV in Davenport–Rock Island–Moline. WGEM-TV was separated from a few of its current Quincy Media sister stations as a result of Gray Television being required to divest stations in markets where both Quincy and Gray own a television station; this included WSIL/KPOB in Carbondale–Cape Girardeau, WREX in Rockford, WKOW in Madison, WAOW/WMOW in Wausau–Rhinelander, WXOW/WQOW in LaCrosse–Eau Claire, KWWL in Cedar Rapids, and KVOA in Tucson. Allen Media Group, a subsidiary of Los Angeles-based Entertainment Studios, acquired the spinoff stations for $380 million. The sale of WREX, however, was optional as Gray's existing station in that market, WIFR-LD, is a low-power station which is not subject to ownership caps.

Subchannel history

WGEM-DT2
WGEM-DT2 is the CW+-affiliated second digital subchannel of WGEM-TV, broadcasting in 720p high definition on channel 10.2.

History

WGEM-DT2 began broadcasting as a WB affiliate in September 1998. It was a cable-only station, and as a result, had the fictional call letters "WEWB". The station was part of The WB 100+ group. Fellow CW affiliate WCWN in Albany, New York,  held the actual WEWB call sign when it was a WB affiliate. Prior to September 1998, the Quincy market received WB programming on cable via the national feed of Chicago-based WGN-TV, which carried WB programming until 1999. Following the 2006 merger of UPN and the WB, "WEWB", which began using the WGEM-DT2 callsign in an official manner, began airing programming from The CW. The station became part of The CW Plus, a service that is a similar operation to The WB 100+. Like all CW Plus affiliates in the Central Time Zone, WGEM-DT2 aired the nationally syndicated morning show The Daily Buzz on weekdays from 5:00 am to 8:00 am.

WGEM-DT3
WGEM-DT3, branded on-air as WGEM Fox, is the Fox-affiliated third digital subchannel of WGEM-TV, broadcasting in 720p high definition on channel 10.3.

History

What is now WGEM-DT3 was established in 1994 by WGEM on Continental Cablevision to fill a void in a market where there was no local over-the-air Fox affiliate. Between 1990 and 1994, Fox programming in the market was limited to off-hours on WGEM's analog signal. It was originally a cable-only station; as a result, it was known on-air with the fictional "CGEM" calls based after the "C" in Continental and "GEM" in WGEM. The station, which was the only Fox-affiliated cable channel to have not been a part of Foxnet, began to air on the third digital subchannel of WGEM-TV in 2006. This was one of the first instances of a major network affiliate operating a cable-only affiliate of another network; this would eventually be repeated on a national level with the launch of The WB 100+ Station Group in September 1998. As part of becoming available over-the-air, it began to use the WGEM-DT3 call sign in an official manner; nonetheless, the "CGEM" branding was retained until 2010. The station remains as the only Fox affiliate in the area, although Charter Spectrum in Hannibal, Missouri also carries KTVI from St. Louis.

News operation
Currently, WGEM-TV airs 25 hours of news per week. WGEM-TV once produced a weeknight 9 p.m. newscast for its then cable-only Fox sister station. Known as CGEM News at 9, it debuted in April 2006 but was canceled in March 2007. The broadcast was anchored by Jake Miller with Chief Meteorologist Rich Cain and Sports Director Ben Marth. At one point, WGEM-DT2 simulcast WGEM-FM's weekday morning show, WGEM Sunrise: Radio Edition. Today it re-airs one WGEM-produced weekly public affairs show, City Desk, along with one other locally produced program, WGEM Academic Challenge. In addition to its main studios, the station used to operate a bureau on South Randolph Street in Macomb, Illinois, but it was closed in 2008. Like all CW Plus affiliates in the Central Time Zone, WGEM-DT2 aired the nationally syndicated morning show The Daily Buzz on weekdays from 5 to 8 a.m.

Technical information

Subchannels
The station's digital signal is multiplexed:

WGEM-TV shut down its analog signal, over VHF channel 10, on February 19, 2009, two days after the original target date when full-power television stations in the United States were to transition from analog to digital broadcasts under federal mandate (which was later pushed back to June 12, 2009). The station's digital signal relocated from its pre-transition ultra high frequency (UHF) channel 54, which was among the high band UHF channels (52-69) that were removed from broadcasting use as a result of the transition, to its analog-era VHF channel 10.

See also
Channel 10 digital TV stations in the United States
Channel 10 virtual TV stations in the United States

References

External links

The CW Quincy, Illinois
WGEM-DT3 "WGEM Fox"

1953 establishments in Illinois
Companies based in Adams County, Illinois
MeTV affiliates
NBC network affiliates
Gray Television
Television channels and stations established in 1953
Television stations in the Quincy–Hannibal area